Rossville is a town and coastal locality in the Shire of Cook, Queensland, Australia.

Geography 
Helenvale is a neighbourhood within the north-west of the locality.

The Annan River and East Normanby River both rise on the slopes of the Trevethan Range in the south of Rossville.

The boundaries of the locality extend into the Coral Sea to incorporate the two Hope Islands into the locality (unofficially known as East Hope and West Hope to distinguish them). The Hope Islands are entirely within the Hope Islands National Park.

History 
The Hope Island are traditionally part of the sea country of the Kuku Yalanji Aboriginal people.

The Hope Islands were named by Lieutenant James Cook of HMS Endeavour  on 13 June 1770. After the Endeavour had become stranded on the Endeavour Reef, Cook hoped that they might reach the islands after freeing the ship.

Rossville Provisional School opened circa 1898 and became Rossville State School on 1 January 1909. It closed in 1964. A new Rossville State School opened on 25 January 1988.

Heritage listings
Rossville has a number of heritage-listed sites, including:
 Collingwood Water Race

Education 
Rossville State School is a government primary (Prep-6) school for boys and girls at Angus Gully Road. In 2017, the school had an enrolment of 32 students with 3 teachers and 7 non-teaching staff (3 full-time equivalent). In 2018, the school had an enrolment of 28 students with 2 teachers and 5 non-teaching staff (2 full-time equivalent).

There are no secondary schools in Rossville with the closest secondary school being Cooktown State School in neighbouring Cooktown, 31.1 kilometres (19.3mi) from Rossville.

References

 
Towns in Queensland
Shire of Cook
Coastline of Queensland
Localities in Queensland